The Knox Football Club is an Australian rules football club located in Wantirna South, Victoria. The club is affiliated in Division 2 of the Eastern Football League.

History
In 1980 the Knox Baptists Football Club (the hawks) was founded and played in the Eastern Suburban Churches Football Association. To affiliation for the ESCFA, the club had to have the backing of a local church. The club dropped Baptist from their name in 1985. The club managed to climb from E grade into C grade by the time they left the association in 1988. In 1986 the club changed its mascot to the Falcons, in order to be in tune with the local council.

In 1989 the club decided to join the Eastern District Football League. The opportunity of playing against the best in the Eastern suburbs was the deciding factor. The change of leagues meant the club had to change its colours, gone were the brown and Gold in with the Red with black sash.
In 1991 the club won its first senior premiership defeating Heathmont 13.11.(89) to 10.10 (70) in the 4th Division.

The club was elevated into 3rd division and took a couple of years to rise to the standard, they made the finals for the first time in 1995 before losing the 1997 and 1999 Grand finals. In 2000 they won the 3rd Division Grand final by defeating Templestowe 15.9 (99) to 15.7 (97).

Quickly establishing themselves in 2nd division they entered in 2001, they lost the 2002 Grand Final to Blackburn by 4 goals. By 2007 they were on top and won the Grand Final by six points against South Croydon,  18.16 (124) to 18.10 (118).

2008 saw them for the first time in 1st Division, they made the finals in 2011 but have not progressed to a Grand final.

Premierships
1991 (4th Div), 2000 (3rd Div), 2007 (2nd Div), 2017 (2nd Div)

Current Staff/Players

Coach: 'Brendon Whitecross '

Captain: ''Jack Beech’

References

External links
  Official club website
 Official Eastern Football League site

Eastern Football League (Australia) clubs
Australian rules football clubs established in 1980
1980 establishments in Australia
Sport in the City of Knox